Giuseppe Comini (20 September 1922 – 6 April 2011) was an Italian fencer. He competed in the team sabre event at the 1956 Summer Olympics.

References

External links
 

1922 births
2011 deaths
Italian male fencers
Olympic fencers of Italy
Fencers at the 1956 Summer Olympics
20th-century Italian people
21st-century Italian people